Rüdiger Dorn (born 1969) is a German-style board game designer.

Career
Fantasy Flight Games published Rüdiger Dorn's fantasy-themed Dragonheart (2010).

He was nominated for the 2005 Spiel des Jahres award for his game Jambo, which also placed 8th for the Deutscher Spiele Preis award. He was also nominated for the 2007 Spiel des Jahres award for his game Die Baumeister von Arkadia (released in English as simply Arkadia) and in 2012 for Las Vegas.  He also won the 2014 Kennerspiel des Jahres award for his game Istanbul. In 2016, he was once again nominated for the Spiel des Jahres with his game Karuba. In 2018 Luxor was also nominated for Spiel des Jahres.

Games
 Luxor (2018)
 Karuba (2015)
 Steam Time (2015)
 Istanbul (2014)
 Las Vegas (2012)
 Waka Waka (2012)
 Il Vecchio (2012)
 Dragonheart (2010)
 Diamonds Club (2008)
 Journey to the Centre of the Earth (2008)
 Die Baumeister von Arkadia (2007)
 Louis XIV (2005)
 Robber Knights (2005)
 Goa (2004)
 Jambo (2004)
 Traders of Genoa (2001)
 Magic Hill (2001)
 Cameo (1992)

References

External links
 
 Rüdiger Dorn at Alea 

Board game designers
1969 births
Living people